Thornton-le-Beans Chapel is in the village of Thornton-le-Beans, North Yorkshire, England.  It is a redundant Anglican chapel of ease. The chapel is recorded in the National Heritage List for England as a designated Grade II listed building. Since 2010 it has been under the care of the Friends of Friendless Churches.

History

The chapel was built in 1770, as a chapel of ease to St Andrew's Church, South Otterington, in the deanery of Mowbray, the archdeaconry of Cleveland, and the diocese of York.  The font was donated by Dr Edward Pusey.  The chapel was restored in 1886.  It was declared redundant on 1 June 1997, and vested in the Friends of Friendless Churches in 2010.

Architecture

Constructed in stone with ashlar dressings, the chapel has a roof of Westmorland slate.  It has s simple plan, consisting of a four-bay nave with a south porch, and a chancel.  At the west end is a gabled bellcote.  On the south side of the church is a single-light window, the porch, a sundial, and a two-light window.  In the chancel is a single-light south window, and an east window with a pointed arch.  There are fragments of ancient glass in the nave windows.

References

Grade II listed churches in North Yorkshire
Churches completed in 1770
Churches preserved by the Friends of Friendless Churches
Hambleton District
1770 establishments in England